Josefina Lamberto Ioldi (1929 – 7 June 2022) was a human rights activist. She advocated for the recovery of historical memory of victims of the Spanish Civil War.  She founded AFFNA-36 – the Association of Firing Squad Victims Families of Navarre.

Her father Vicente Lamberto, a trade unionist, and his sister Maravillas Lamberto were killed in 1936.

Life 
She was born in Larraga in 1929. Her father, Vicente Lamberto, was a unionist militant of the Unión General de Trabajadores, and her mother, Paulina Yoldi, was a housewife. After two older sisters, Josefina was the third daughter. They lived a modest and dignified life in Navarre until the beginning of the Civil War. On 15 August 1936,  her father was killed by the fascists, and his older sister, Maravillas, was brutally raped and murdered. They stole all the family's property.

Mother Paulina was devastated, but continued to survive as best she could with young Josefina (then 7 years old) and her sister Pilar (then 10 years old). The mother first worked as a beggar, and then the three worked as maids in the house of some village, in the case of Josefina, according to her statements, in the house of Falange member Julio Redín Sanz, who participated in the rape and murder of his sister Marvillas.

At the age of 21, Josefina was sent to be a nun and the congregation sent her to Pakistan to work in an orphanage.  After a few years, she stopped being a nun, and stated that she was treated very badly by the religious institutions. In Pakistan, they didn't even want to help her learn the local languages and she felt like an exploited worker most of the time. When she asked to return from there, because his mother was ill, permission was delayed, and she returned to Navarre after her mother was already dead.

She continued to be a nun in Madrid for 19 years, but she continued to be exploited at work, and she saw that she was not even allowed to help the most needy. So in 1996, losing her faith, she abandoned that way of life. Without losing her vocation to help, she lived in the last years at the Rruki Etxe in Pamplona, but from there he also worked as a volunteer helping the soup kitchen called Paris 365.

She died on 7 June 2022, in Iruñea, Pamplona.

References 

1929 births
2022 deaths
Spanish human rights activists
People from Tafalla (comarca)